Road 77, also known as the Haraz Road, is one of the most important roads from Tehran to the northern mountains of Iran, and the Iranian coast on the southern Caspian Sea. Amol is the first northern city of this road. Along the road landscapes, Plain, Mountain, Historical tourism. Waterfall and village.

Route
The road's route travels through Tehran Province and Mazandaran Province.  It crosses the Alborz mountain range and then descends northwards down the Haraz River Valley. 
The road is the shortest route from Tehran to the north ( 180 km) and in recent years some parts of the road has been widened and the safety has been improved.  It passes through the towns of Amol and Rudehen.

Features
Haraz Road is the nearest road to Mount Damavand, the highest peak in Iran and Middle East. 
Lar Dam, Lar National Park, which Mount Damavand is within, is easily accessible from Road 77.

Central Alborz mountain range map

Gallery

See also
 Road 59 − Karaj-Chaloos Road — another main Tehran−Caspian route.

References

External links 

 Iran road map on Young Journalists Club

77
Transportation in Mazandaran Province
Transport in Tehran
Transportation in Tehran Province
Alborz (mountain range)
Amol County